Miss Barbados may refer to:
 Miss Barbados Universe, Barbados' delegation for Miss Universe
 Miss Barbados World, Barbados' delegation for Miss World